The following is a timeline of the history of the city of Augusta, Georgia, USA.

18th century

 1740 - Savannah-Augusta "highway" constructed.
 1750 - St. Paul's Church established.
 1779 - January 29: Augusta taken by British forces.
 1780 - Georgia state capital relocated to Augusta.
 1781
 April 16: Siege of Augusta by American forces begins.
 May: British-occupied Fort Grierson taken by American forces.
 1785 - Academy of Richmond County opens.
 1789
 Town of Augusta incorporated.
 The Augusta Chronicle newspaper in publication.
 1790
 "Negro" Baptist Church established.
 Government House built.
 1791
 May: U.S. president George Washington visits Augusta.
 Bridge built across Savannah River.
 1792 - John Milton becomes mayor.
 1795 - Meadow Garden built as summer house of George Walton, youngest signer of the U.S. Declaration of Independence.

19th century
 1802 - Wray's drug store in business.
 1805 - Methodist church built (approximate date).
 1808 - Library Company and Thespian Society founded.
 1810 - Bank of Augusta established.
 1812 - First Presbyterian Church built.
 1815 - Catholic church built (approximate date).
 1817 - City of Augusta incorporated.
 1818 - Magnolia Cemetery in use.
 1819 - Augusta Arsenal built.
 1820 - First Baptist Church built.
 1821
 Town of Hamburg established in South Carolina across the river from Augusta.
 Free School Society (charity) formed.
 1822 - Medical Society incorporated.
 1824 - City Hall built.
 1825 - Lafayette visits Augusta.
 1827 - Library Society founded.
 1828
 Medical Academy of Georgia founded.
 Unitarian church built.
 1829 - April 3: Fire.
 1830 - Population: 6,710.
 1833 - Charleston-Augusta railway begins operating.
 1836 - Broad Street fire.
 1837
 Georgia Railroad (Augusta-Berzelia) begins operating.
 Augusta Chronicle & Sentinel newspaper begins publication.
 1840 - Yellow fever epidemic.
 1845 - Southern Baptist Convention founded at a meeting in Augusta.
 1847 - Augusta Canal built.
 1848
 Young Men's Library Association formed.
 Signers Monument dedicated.
 1850 - Population: 9,448.
 1854
 Augusta and Savannah Railroad begins operating.
 Yellow fever epidemic.
 1858 - Fruitland Nurseries in business.
 1860 - Population: 12,493.
 1861 - January 24: Federal arsenal occupied by Georgia state forces.
 1862
 Confederate Powderworks begins operating.
 St. Patrick's Church built.
 1863 - April: Photo-illustrated wanted poster introduced.
 1864 - January: Flood.
 1865
 Federal army takes city.
 Colored American newspaper begins publication.
 1866 - State Freedmen's Conventions held in Augusta.
 1867 - Augusta Institute (later Morehouse College) established.
 1869
 "Iron works factory" in business.
 Synagogue built.
 1870 - Cotton States Mechanics and Agricultural Fair held in Augusta.
 1877 - Augusta Evening News begins publication.
 1878 - Augusta Confederate Monument dedicated.
 1879 - Augusta Institute relocated to Atlanta from Augusta.
 1880 - Population: 21,891.
 1882 - Paine Institute established.
 1886 - Haines Normal and Industrial Institute founded.
 1890 - Augusta Herald newspaper begins publication.
 1892 - Negro Press Association of Georgia formed during meeting in Augusta.
 1894 - Buffalo kindergarten opens.

20th century

 1900 - Population: 39,441.
 1908 - Flood.
 1909 - Church of the Immaculate Conception established.
 1910 - Springfield Baptist Church built.
 1912
 Flood.
 "Street railway strike" occurs.
 Summerville becomes part of Augusta.
 1916
 Fire.
 Levee and United States Post Office and Courthouse built.
 1917 - U.S. military Camp Gordon and Camp Hancock established near Augusta.
 1918 - Imperial Theatre opens.
 1919 - City's "first paved four-lane highway" opens.
 1926 - Junior College of Augusta established.
 1933 - Augusta Museum and Augusta National Golf Club established.
 1934
C.T. Walker Traditional Magnet School is established.
WRDW radio begins broadcasting.
 1935 - City bicentennial.
 1937 - August: Blood drive organized.
 1940 - Augusta Drive-In cinema in business.
 1945 - September 15: Future opera star Jessye Norman born in Augusta.
 1948 - City manager form of government adopted.
 1949 - Lucy Craft Laney High School established.
 1950 - Bush Field begins operating as a civilian airport.
 1953 - WJBF-TV (television) begins broadcasting.
 1954 - WRDW-TV (television) begins broadcasting.
 1961 - Augusta Area Vocational-Technical School founded.
 1970 - May 11–13: Racial unrest.
 1978 - Augusta Mall in business.
 1996 - "City of Augusta consolidated with Richmond County to form Augusta-Richmond County."
 1997 - April 24: African-American golfer Tiger Woods, age 21, wins 1997 Masters Tournament.

21st century

 2005 - John Barrow becomes U.S. representative for Georgia's 12th congressional district.
 2010 - Population: 195,844.
 2014 - Ice storm.
 2015
 Hardie Davis becomes mayor.
 Rick W. Allen becomes U.S. representative for Georgia's 12th congressional district.

See also
 History of Augusta, Georgia
 List of mayors of Augusta, Georgia
 National Register of Historic Places listings in Richmond County, Georgia
 Timelines of other cities in Georgia: Athens, Atlanta, Columbus, Macon, Savannah

References

Bibliography

External links

 
 
 Items related to Augusta, various dates (via Digital Public Library of America).
 

Years in Georgia (U.S. state)
 
Augusta